The Capture of Porrentruy was a short siege of the Swiss town of Porrentruy, held by Austria, by the French. It took place on 28 April 1792 and was a French victory. It was the First engagement of the War of the First Coalition.

Course
On 20 April 1792, France declared war on Francis II, Holy Roman Emperor, who five days earlier had given Louis XVI of France an ultimatum regarding the possessionary princes of the Alsace. However, the Coalition's forces were slow to press their advantage and the armée du Rhin's commander Nicolas Luckner decided to attack the stronghold at Porrentruy to prevent an invasion. He had a camp of 12,000 men at far end of the Basse-Alsace, between Lauterbourg, Landau and Weissembourg.

Luckner commanded Adam Philippe, Comte de Custine to advance into the Porrentruy province, which belonged to the Prince-Bishopric of Basel. This would avoid this portion of the French frontier being invaded.  At the head of 2,000 men, with Colonel Charles Grangier de La Ferriere, commander of the 23rd Infantry Regiment, as his second-in-command and followed by three infantry battalions, an artillery company and around 300 dragoons, Custine marched into the province and demanded Porrentruy's surrender. It had a garrison of 400 Austrians, but the Prince-bishop did not want to support a siege and marched the garrison away to Bienne. Custine thus captured Porrentruy without a fight and was able to dig in on the Laumont mountain to defend the valleys of Fribourg, Bienne, Basel and Solothurn.

Bibliography
Victoires, conquêtes, désastres, revers et guerres civiles des Français, volume 7

References

Battles involving Austria
Conflicts in 1792
1792 in France
Battles of the War of the First Coalition
1792 in the Holy Roman Empire